The Scottish Dark Sky Observatory was an astronomical observatory located near Loch Doon Loch Doon, East Ayrshire, Scotland. It was situated on a hilltop site overlooking the Craigengillan Estate and Dalmellington. The site is located in the northern edge of the Galloway Forest Dark Sky Park, and within the Galloway and Southern Ayrshire UNESCO Biosphere, with low levels of light pollution and clear horizon views.

The observatory was built through 2012 and was officially opened by then First Minister of Scotland Alex Salmond. The building and facilities were expanded in 2017 with the addition of a digital planetarium, officially opened by the Lord Lieutenant of Ayrshire and Arran John Duncan.  After opening the observatory saw visitor numbers increase exponentially, making it one of the top tourist attractions in Scotland.

The SDSO was open all throughout the year, with its main aims being to allow people of all ages and abilities to learn and experience the wonders of astronomy and space, and to be a vital educational resource to children in the region.

The SDSO suffered a devastating fire during the early hours of 23 June 2021. The fire is currently being treated as suspicious.

One year after the fire, the SDSO announced on social media platforms that they have appointed a design team and architect to rebuild the SDSO, although no schedule or plans have been confirmed as yet.

External links

 
 SDSO on Twitter
 Scottish Dark Sky Observatory on Facebook
 Trip Advisor reviews
 VisitScotland Four Star Visitor Attraction

References

Astronomical observatories in Scotland
Buildings and structures in East Ayrshire
2012 establishments in Scotland
Cultural infrastructure completed in 2012
Tourist attractions in Scotland
Tourist attractions in East Ayrshire